The 23rd Ohio Infantry Regiment was an infantry regiment in the Union Army during much of the American Civil War. It served in the Eastern Theater in a variety of campaigns and battles, and is remembered with a stone memorial on the Antietam National Battlefield not far from Burnside's Bridge.

The regiment later became noted for its many up-and-coming politicians. Future presidents Rutherford B. Hayes and William McKinley served in this unit, as did future U.S. senator and associate justice of the United States Supreme Court Stanley Matthews and Robert P. Kennedy, a future U.S. Congressman. Other notable officers included James M. Comly and Eliakim P. Scammon, both of whom became influential nationally after the war. Harrison Gray Otis, the famed owner and publisher of the Los Angeles Times, also fought with the 23rd Ohio during the war.

Organization and service
The 23rd Ohio Infantry Regiment was organized at Camp Chase (Columbus, Ohio) and mustered into duty on June 11, 1861, as a three-year regiment. Its 950 enlistees were originally led by Col. William Rosecrans. In July, after training and drilling, the regiment departed for western Virginia, where it served for several months, helping to restore that portion of Virginia to the Union. The 23rd was attached to Jacob D. Cox's Kanawha Brigade and served throughout much of the war in what became the IX Corps. The unit saw heavy action during the Battle of South Mountain, where Colonel Hayes was wounded in an attack on the slopes near Fox's Gap.  Within a week, the regiment fought at Antietam in the fields southeast of Sharpsburg, Maryland, before returning to duty in West Virginia. It was again heavily engaged in Philip Sheridan's 1864 Valley Campaign. The regiment mustered out in July 1865.

The regiment lost 5 officers and 154 enlisted men killed and mortally wounded, and 1 officer and 130 enlisted men by disease (total 290 out of 2230 who were members of the regiment at various times).

See also

Ohio in the Civil War

References
 Dyer, Frederick Henry, A Compendium of the War of the Rebellion. 3 volumes. New York: T. Yoseloff, 1908.
Reid, Whitelaw, Ohio in the War: Her Statesmen, Her Generals, and Soldiers. Volume 2. Cincinnati: Moore, Wilstach, & Baldwin, 1868.

Further reading
 Ohio Roster Commission. Official Roster of the Soldiers of the State of Ohio in the War on the Rebellion, 1861–1865, compiled under the direction of the Roster commission. 12 vol. Akron: Werner Co., 1886–95.

External links

 Ohio in the Civil War: 23rd OVI by Larry Stevens
 National Park Service: Civil War Soldiers and Sailors System
 Ohio in the Civil War User Based Archive and Network
 Battle Unit Details - 23rd Regiment, Ohio Infantry - National Park Service

Units and formations of the Union Army from Ohio
1861 establishments in Ohio
Military units and formations established in 1861
Military units and formations disestablished in 1865
William McKinley
Rutherford B. Hayes